Carlo Scognamiglio Pasini (born 27 November 1944) is an Italian economist and politician. He is a university professor in applied economics, and was Chancellor of the LUISS University of Rome (1984–1992). He was President of the Italian Senate from 1994 to 1996 and Minister of Defence from 1998 to 2000.

Life and career
After graduating in Economics from Bocconi University in Milan, Scognamiglio specialized in Industrial Economics at the London School of Economics (LSE) under the supervision of Basil Yamey. A professor of Finance and Industrial Economics since 1973, he was elected Chancellor of the LUISS University in 1984. In 1988 the Académie française awarded him its prestigious Economics prize.

As a sportsman, Scognamiglio was a world sailing champion (winning the International Ocean Races - One Ton Cup in 1976).

Political career
In 1992 Scognamiglio became a Senator for the Italian Liberal Party (PLI), and was soon appointed as chairman of the Senate's Committee for European Affairs. Re-elected in 1994 for Forza Italia (FI), he was President of the Senate for the first two years of the XII Government.

In 1998 he joined the new party established by former President Francesco Cossiga, the Democratic Union for the Republic (UDR), and was Minister of Defence from 21 October 1998 to 22 December 1999, a period that spanned NATO's intervention in Kosovo (March–June 1999). As minister he promoted the repeal of the draft, the transformation of the Italian armed forces on a professional basis, the opening of military service to women, and the rise of the Corps of Carabinieri as a fourth branch of the Italian military forces.

Presently, he is Professor Emeritus of applied economics and lifetime trustee of the Aspen Institute. He is also Honorary President of the reconstituted Italian Liberal Party. He is also a member of the Italy-USA Foundation.

Publications
Scognamiglio is the author of over 80 publications in English and Italian, including: 
  L'Arte della Ricchezza. Cesare Beccaria economista. Mondadori, Milano 2014
 Keynes and the New Millennium Crisis, Treves Editore, Roma 2009.
 Adam Smith. Adam Smith visto da Carlo Scognamiglio Pasini, Luiss University Press, Roma 2007 and 20092.
 Economia industriale. Economia dei mercati imperfetti, Luiss University Press, Roma 2006.
 Adam Smith XXI secolo, Luiss University Press, Roma 2005.
 La guerra del Kosovo, Rizzoli, Milano 2002.
 La democrazia in Italia, Rizzoli, Milano 1996.
 Teoria e politica della finanza industriale, il Mulino, Bologna 1987.
 Crisi e risanamento dell'industria italiana, Giuffrè, Milano 1979.
 Mercato dei capitali, borse valori e finanziamento delle imprese industriali, Franco Angeli Edizioni, Milano 1974.
 The Economics of the Stock Market, Giuffrè, Milano 1972.

References

1944 births
Living people
Italian Ministers of Defence
Democratic Union for the Republic politicians
Forza Italia politicians
Presidents of the Italian Senate
Italian Liberal Party politicians
Italian Liberal Party (1997) politicians
The Liberals (Italy) politicians
20th-century Italian politicians